Oscar Henric Hyman (25 November 1877 – 11 January 1955) was an Australian rules footballer who played with Collingwood in the Victorian Football League (VFL) and South Adelaide, West Torrens, North Adelaide and Sturt in the South Australian Football Association (SAFA).

At age 38 he enlisted to serve in World War I and served until the end of the war.

Notes

External links 

		
Oscar Hyman's profile at Collingwood Forever	

1877 births
1955 deaths
Australian rules footballers from South Australia
Collingwood Football Club players
South Adelaide Football Club players
West Torrens Football Club players
North Adelaide Football Club players
Sturt Football Club players
Australian military personnel of World War I